The Margites is a comic mock-epic ascribed to Homer that is largely lost. From references to the work that survived, it is known that its central character is an exceedingly stupid man named Margites (from ancient Greek , margos, "raving, mad; lustful"), who was so dense he did not know which parent had given birth to him. His name gave rise to the recherché adjective margitomanēs, "mad as Margites", used by Philodemus.

It was commonly attributed to Homer, as by Aristotle (Poetics 13.92): "His Margites indeed provides an analogy: as are the Iliad and Odyssey to our tragedies, so is the Margites to our comedies"; but the work, among a mixed genre of works loosely labelled "Homerica" in antiquity, was attributed to Pigres, a Greek poet of Halicarnassus, in the massive medieval Greek encyclopaedia called the Suda. Harpocration also writes that it is attributed to Homer. Basil of Caesarea writes that the work is attributed to Homer but he states that he is unsure regarding this attribution.

It is written in mixed hexameter and iambic lines, an oddity characteristic also of the Batrachomyomachia (likewise attributed to Pigres), which inserts a pentameter line after each hexameter of the Iliad as a curious literary game.

Margites was famous in the ancient world, but only these following lines are transmitted in medieval sources:

Him, then, the Gods made neither a delver nor a ploughman,
Nor in any other way wise; he failed every art.
as quoted by Aristotle

He knew many things, but he knew them badly ...
as quoted by Plato

There came to Colophon an old man and divine singer,
a servant of the Muses and of far-shooting Apollo.
In his dear hands he held a sweet-toned lyre ...
as quoted by Atilius Fortunatianus

The fox knows many a wile;
but the hedgehog's one trick can beat them all.
as quoted by Zenobius (attributed simply to "Homer")

A few additional fragments (P.Oxy 2309, 3693 and 3694) were found among the Oxyrhynchus papyruses and published in volume II of Iambi et Elegi Graeci ante Alexandrum cantati by M. L. West.

Due to the Margites character, the Greeks used the word to describe fool and useless people. Demosthenes called Alexander the Great Margites in order to insult and degrade him.

References

Bibliography
Smith, William. Dictionary of Greek and Roman Biography and Mythology, 1870, article on Margites, v. 2, page 949.
West, M.L. Iambi et Elegi Graeci ante Alexandrum cantati, vol. II. Oxford: Oxford University Press, 1992. .

Ancient Greek mock-heroic poems
Lost poems
Homer
Greek words and phrases
Ancient Greek epic poems